The 1994 Strachan Challenge – Event 1 was a professional non-ranking snooker tournament, that was held in February 1994 at the Jimmy White Snooker Lodge in Aldershot, England.
 
Anthony Hamilton won the tournament by defeating Andy Hicks nine frames to four in the final.


Main draw

References

1994 in snooker
1994 in English sport